John V. Evans (born 5 July 1933) is a British-American radio astronomer born in Manchester, England. He obtained his Ph.D. at the University of Manchester, and has been a professor at the Lincoln Laboratory of the Massachusetts Institute of Technology since 1960.

He received the 1975 Appleton Prize.

Evans showed how long-period lunar echo fading could be used to measure the ionospheric electron density. William Smith used Long Michelson interferometer observations of sources to do the same. He also showed that lunar scattering was limb-darkened. With G. N. Taylor, he bounced radar echoes off Venus in September 1959. He has performed radar studies of the Moon, Venus, etc. He also worked on detecting Sputnik 1 with Jodrell Bank. He co-authored with T. Hagfors the classic textbook of Radar Astronomy.

In 1984, Evans was elected a member of the National Academy of Engineering for the development of remote sensing technology which has given us new understanding of the earth's upper atmosphere and the atmospheres of other planets.

References

External links
 Biographical Dictionary of Great Astronomers

1933 births
Living people
20th-century British astronomers
20th-century American astronomers
Massachusetts Institute of Technology faculty
MIT Lincoln Laboratory people
Alumni of the University of Manchester